Concision (also called succinctness, brevity, laconicism, or conciseness) is a communication principle of eliminating redundancy.

For example, a sentence of "It is a fact that most arguments must try to convince readers, that is the audience, that the arguments are true." may be expressed more concisely as "Most arguments must demonstrate their truth to readers." the observations that the statement is a fact and that readers are its audience are redundant, and it is unnecessary to repeat the word "arguments" in the sentence.

Statements of the principle 
Polymath Blaise Pascal wrote in a 1657 letter:

William Strunk and E. B. White's The Elements of Style, an American English style guide, says of concision that:

Joseph M. Williams's Style: Lessons in Clarity and Grace suggests six principles for concision:

 Delete words that mean little or nothing.
 Delete words that repeat the meaning of other words.
 Delete words implied by other words.
 Replace a phrase with a word.
 Change negatives to affirmatives.
 Delete useless adjectives and adverbs.

Concision is taught to students at all levels. It is valued highly in expository English writing, but less by some other cultures.

Succinctness is a related concept. "Laconic" speech or writing refers to the pithy bluntness that the Laconian people of ancient Greece were reputedly known for. In computing, succinct data structures balance minimal storage use against efficiency of access. In algorithmic game theory, a succinct game is one that may be accurately described in a simpler form than its normal representation.

See also

References

External links
 Charles Fabara. "The Concise Expression Handbook" https://archive.org/details/concise-expressions/mode/2up

Copy editing
Communication
Written communication
Metatheory
Principles
Cognitive grammar